The events of 1989 in anime.

Accolades 
Animation Film Award: Kiki's Delivery Service

Releases

See also
1989 in animation

Deaths
February 9: Osamu Tezuka (b. 1928)

References

External links 
Japanese animated works of the year, listed in the IMDb

Anime
Anime
Years in anime